Zoombies is a 2016 American science fiction action horror television film directed by Glenn R. Miller and written by Scotty Mullen. It stars Ione Butler, Andrew Asper, Marcus Anderson Kim Nielsen, LaLa Nestor, Brianna Chomer, Aaron Groben, Kaiwi Lyman-Mersereau, Tammy Klein, Isaac Anderson, William McMichael and Reuben Uy. Taking place at the soon-to-be-open Eden Wildlife Zoo, the film follows a group of staff members and college students as they find themselves being attacked by the zoo's animals who have turned into aggressive and bloodthirsty zombies after being infected by a mysterious virus. 

Mullen took inspiration from Jurassic Park, Alfred Hitchcock's The Birds, and Zombeavers for the film. The film is produced and distributed by The Asylum and was released on March 1, 2016, receiving . A prequel Zoombies 2 was released on March 26, 2019. A spin-off film, Aquarium of the Dead, was released on May 21, 2021.

Plot
The Eden Wildlife Zoo, a zoo containing endangered animals, is having its intern orientation day, where college students applying for jobs as interns are touring the zoo. Meanwhile, some of the zoo's monkeys contract an unknown disease and are taken to the clinic where the veterinarians use intracardiac epinephrine, a forbidden serum, in order to save the life of a monkey that suffered a cardiac arrest. The contagious pathogen spreads to all of the monkeys in the room, turning them into zombies with a predatory behaviour towards humans. They attack the veterinarians and kill one of them, while the remaining one manages to activate an alarm.

As the college students arrive, the alarm reaches the zoo's security. One of the security team members, Johnny, decides to check on the veterinarians himself. However, when he doesn't return, the security team, accompanied by college student Gage, make their way to the clinic. Once there, they discover that Johnny and one of the veterinarians are dead. The remaining veterinarian, Dr. Gordon, is barely alive. The monkeys violently attack the group, killing two of the guards. Gage, head of security Rex and newly hired Lizzy Hogan manage to escape. Ellen Rogers, the manager of the zoo, gets word of the mayhem and puts the zoo on lockdown. The disease spreads throughout the zoo, infecting a group of wild hogs that attack three of the students. Lizzy, Gage and Rex arrive just as the students are attacked by infected giraffes, which kill two of the students. They manage to rescue the remaining student, Amber, but Gage is injured in the process. As Lizzy and Rex tend to Gage's wounds, Amber steals Rex's jeep. Lizzy, Gage and Rex are forced to use a group of non-infected elephants as transportation.

A police team arrives at the zoo to attempt to eliminate the threat but they are killed by a group of infected lions. Amber, meanwhile, reaches the front gate and demands that Ellen, who is watching over the security cameras, open it. An infected lion suddenly attacks her. Ellen's daughter Thea is then attacked by an infected koala but she kills it with a baseball bat. Ellen inspects the koala's blood and discovers that the disease was created by an unknown enzyme found in the koala's cerebral cortex. She encourages birdkeeper Chelsea to release the birds to prevent them from being infected, to no avail. Meanwhile, Lizzy, Gage and Rex are attacked by a group of infected lemurs and Rex is injured. One of the workers, Daxton and his intern A.J. manage to fend off the zombies and the group takes refuge inside of the gorilla lab. Daxton goes to check on the zoo's endangered Cross River gorilla, Kifo, finding him to be infected. Kifo kills him and invades the lab. Rex stabs him, but Kifo crushes his head in retaliation.

Lizzy, Gage and A.J. escape and find a jeep with a feeble and dying Amber driving. Amber dies and the group is attacked by a group of infected lions as they remove her corpse. They manage to kill the lions but they accidentally crash the jeep in the process. They then attempt to reach the watch tower by using an unfinished zipline. A.J. falls to his death in the process. The group reunites with Ellen and Thea and they theorize that the birds have become infected. They decide to set the aviary on fire using a series of gas cans, but before they do so, Lizzy and Gage go inside to rescue Chelsea and her intern Ricky. However, they soon find that Ricky has been killed by the infected birds. They then find Chelsea, alive but badly injured, with an infected bald eagle using her organs as a nest. Lizzy and Gage notice smoke rising, realizing that Ellen has begun burning the aviary down, and manage to escape. Ellen reluctantly sets the aviary on fire and they set off an additional explosion using Ellen's truck, killing the birds. Kifo then appears and chases the group to the gate where Ellen seemingly shoots him to death. The four are then rescued by a helicopter. However, after they are rescued, Kifo regains consciousness, revealing he is still alive.

Cast 
 Ione Butler as Leslie "Lizzy" Hogan
 Andrew Asper as Gage
 LaLa Nestor as Thea
 Kim Nielsen as Dr. Ellen Rogers
 Marcus Anderson as Rex
 Brianna Chomer as Amber 
 Aaron Groben as A.J.
 Kaiwi Lyman-Mersereau as Daxton
 William McMichael as Boris
 Reuben Uy as Ty
 Isaac Anderson as Ricky
 Tammy Klein as Chelsea
 Cedric Jonathan as Johnny
 Joe Conti as Monte Zuigen
 Noa Pharaoh as Dr. Gordon
 Jennifer Titus as Robin
 Michael Delgado as Gus 
 Jay Kwon as Kyle
 Bryan Sloyer as Robbie

Reception 
Ted Hentschke of Dread Central rated the film 3/5 stars and wrote, "There's nothing defensibly good about this movie. What it is, however, is fun."

Prequel and Spin-off 
On March 26, 2019, a prequel was later released, titled Zoombies 2, and a spin-off in 2021, titled Aquarium of the Dead.

References

External links
 
 
 Zoombies at The Asylum

2016 films
2016 television films
2016 horror films
2010s science fiction horror films
American zombie films
2010s English-language films
Films set in zoos
Films about viral outbreaks
Films shot in California
American science fiction horror films
The Asylum films
American horror television films
American science fiction television films
2010s American films